Édouard Sagna (born 11 September 1940) is a Senegalese middle-distance runner. He competed in the men's 1500 metres at the 1968 Summer Olympics.

References

1940 births
Living people
Athletes (track and field) at the 1968 Summer Olympics
Senegalese male middle-distance runners
Olympic athletes of Senegal
Place of birth missing (living people)